The Hill Academy is an independent school in Ontario, Canada, for student athletes in Grades 5 -12/PG with a focus on hockey, lacrosse and golf. It is co-ed, and serves grades 5-12.

History
The Hill Academy was founded in 2006 by the Merrill family, for “dedicated student-athletes.”

In 2006 it had 16 student-athletes and held classes at a conference center in Orangeville, Ontario, north-west of Toronto. By 2017 it relocated to three houses in the village of Kleinburg. The 24 students practiced at a community park, and trained at a local gym. In 2010 it had 85 students.

In 2016 Hill Academy had 185 student-athletes divided among four lacrosse teams—three boys’ and one girls’—and three hockey teams. Their classrooms were located next to the Vaughan Sports Village in Vaughan, Ontario. They were ranked the world’s No. 1 high school lacrosse team.

In September 2020 The Hill Academy moved into its new campus on the 134-acre former SGI Canada Caledon Centre for Culture and Education near Alton in Caledon, Ontario. The campus has a turf field named in Honour of former student-athlete Jamieson Kuhlmann - The Jamieson Kuhlmann Legacy Field.

Curriculum
The Hill Academy offers a curriculum to student-athletes in grades 5 -12. It also offers a post-graduate year called "The Breakaway Year," with a stated goal of raising the profile of student-athletes in order to open doors for their future.

Staff
Peter Merrill is the CEO and Founder of Hill. Christy Flynn is the Secondary School Principal, and Tory Merrill is the Junior School Principal. The school has a sports scientist on staff, professional coaches, and academic faculty.

References

External links
The Hill Academy home page

High schools in Dufferin County
Educational institutions established in 2006
Orangeville, Ontario
High schools in the Regional Municipality of York
2006 establishments in Ontario
Private schools in Ontario
High schools in Caledon, Ontario